Abu Ibrahim may refer to

Abu Ibrahim (Nigerian politician), member of the Nigerian Senate
Khalil Ibrahim Al-Zayani or Abu Ibrahim (born 1947), Saudi Arabian football coach
Mohammad Zeki Mahjoub or Abu Ibrahim, Egyptian-Canadian who was arrested in 2000 on a security certificate for his alleged membership in the Vanguards of Conquest
Sajeel Shahid or Abu Ibrahim, one of the leaders of Al-Muhajiroun, an Islamist group based in the United Kingdom
Husayn Muhammad al-Umari or Abu Ibrahim, Palestinian individual on the FBI's "Most Wanted Terrorists" list for his alleged role in the bombing of Pan Am Flight 830